Minit may refer to:

 Minit (video game), 2018 adventure video game
 Minit Mart, American chain of convenience stores
 Minit Records, American record label